The Dick Tracy soundtrack is a 1990 soundtrack album to the film of the same name. It features songs written by Andy Paley and performed by such diverse musicians and singers as k.d. lang, Take 6, Jerry Lee Lewis, Brenda Lee, Tommy Page, August Darnell, Patti Austin, Erasure, Ice-T, LaVern Baker, Al Jarreau, Darlene Love and Paley himself. Most of the songs on the album are performed in the style of the music of the 1930s, the era in which the film is set, with the exception of more modern performances such as a rock and roll version of Lewis' "It Was the Whiskey Talkin' (Not Me)" and a "90's Mix" of Ice-T's "Dick Tracy".

The album is one of three soundtracks released alongside the film, the others being Madonna's I'm Breathless album, and an orchestral score by Danny Elfman (which was expanded by Intrada Records in 2016). Only half of the album tracks—"Ridin' the Rails", "Pep, Vim and Verve", "It Was the Whiskey Talkin' (Not Me)", "You're in the Doghouse Now", "Some Lucky Day", "Blue Nights", "Looking Glass Sea", and  "Rompin' & Stompin'"—appear on the film. Three Stephen Sondheim songs recorded by Madonna for the film are included on I'm Breathless, along with "Now I'm Following You" which was sung by Andy Paley in the film. A month after the release of the soundtrack album, Ice-T released a single titled "Dick Tracy" which featured a different song from the one featured on the album.

Track listing

Charts

References

Action film soundtracks
1990 soundtrack albums
Sire Records soundtracks
Warner Records soundtracks
Dick Tracy
Albums produced by Andy Paley